Danario Alexander (born August 7, 1988) is a former American football wide receiver. He played college football at Missouri.

Early years
Alexander earned honorable mention All-State and First-team All-District honors as a senior wide receiver for Marlin High School in 2005 after catching 49 passes for 850 yards and 9 touchdowns He was named Second-team Super Cen-Tex in 2005 as well as an honorable mention All-District pick as a junior in 2004. Alexander was an excellent all-around athlete who was a First-team All-District performer in baseball and was also the State champion in the triple jump (personal best of ) and State runner-up in the long jump (PB of ) in 2006.

College career

As a true freshman for Missouri in 2006, Alexander played in all 13 games and finished with 15 receptions for 251 yards and a touchdown. As a sophomore in 2007 he missed three games due to an injury to his left wrist. He finished the season starting two of 10 games, recording 37 receptions for 417 yards and two touchdowns. As a junior in 2008 he played 10 of 13 games starting one and finished with 26 receptions for 329 yards and five touchdowns. As a senior, he started all 13 games (including the 2009 Texas Bowl), and finished with 113 receptions for an NCAA best 1,781 yards and 14 touchdowns, averaging 15.8 yards per reception and 137 yards per game.
He was named a 2009 Sports Illustrated first-team All American. On February 25, 2016 he was inducted into the University of Missouri Intercollegiate Athletics Hall of Fame.

Professional career

Pre-draft
A mid-round draft prospect, Alexander went undrafted, mainly due to surgery on his left knee in February 2010 to repair an injury during the week of the Senior Bowl. He was unable to work out at the NFL Combine or his pro day at the University of Missouri.

St. Louis Rams
On August 22, 2010, Alexander signed a contract with the St. Louis Rams. On September 4, he was cut. However, Alexander was signed to the Rams' practice squad. On October 11, 2010, he was signed to the Rams' active roster in place of the injured Mark Clayton.

Alexander scored his first NFL touchdown on October 17, 2010, catching a 38-yard pass from Rams quarterback Sam Bradford. On that day, which was also his NFL debut, he caught four passes for 72 yards and one touchdown.

San Diego Chargers
On October 18, 2012, Alexander signed with the San Diego Chargers.

On November 11, 2012, less than a month after being signed off the street, Alexander had 5 receptions for 134 yards, including an 80-yard touchdown in which he broke 2 tackles against the Tampa Bay Buccaneers.

In just 10 games in the 2012 season, Alexander had 37 receptions for 658 yards and seven touchdowns.

On August 6, 2013, Alexander suffered a torn right ACL during practice and was expected to miss the entire 2013 season. On August 16, 2013, Alexander was waived-injured by the Chargers. On August 19, 2013, he was placed on the injured reserve list after clearing waivers.

Personal life

On June 27, 2015 Danario married Stefanie Alexander. The couple, and their daughter Ashley, reside in Houston, Texas. They jointly work on projects through the Danario Alexander Foundation, which focuses on preventing juvenile delinquency.

See also
 List of NCAA major college football yearly receiving leaders

References

External links

Danario Alexander's Official Website
Missouri Tigers bio
San Diego Chargers bio
St. Louis Rams bio

1988 births
Living people
People from Marlin, Texas
Players of American football from Texas
American football wide receivers
Missouri Tigers football players
St. Louis Rams players
San Diego Chargers players